Isochorista is a genus of moths belonging to the subfamily Tortricinae of the family Tortricidae.

Species
Isochorista acrodesma (Lower, 1902)
Isochorista chaodes Meyrick, 1910
Isochorista encotodes Meyrick, 1910
Isochorista helota Meyrick, 1910
Isochorista melanocrypta Meyrick, 1910
Isochorista panaeolana Meyrick, 1881
Isochorista parmiferana (Meyrick, 1881)
Isochorista pumicosa Meyrick, 1910
Isochorista ranulana Meyrick, 1881
Isochorista sulcata Diakonoff, 1952

See also
List of Tortricidae genera

References

 , 1881, Proc. Linn. Soc. N.S. W. 6: 424.
 , 2005, World Catalogue of Insects 5.

External links

tortricidae.com

Archipini
Tortricidae genera